Heteromicta myrmecophila is a species of snout moth in the genus Heteromicta. It was described by Alfred Jefferis Turner in 1913. It is found in Australia.

References

Moths described in 1905
Tirathabini